Alice L. Pérez Sánchez (Costa Rica, December 23, 1963) was the Vice-dean of Research at the University of Costa Rica between 2012-2016.  Pérez has a degree in chemistry (1989) from the University of Costa Rica, and a Ph.D. in organic chemistry from Simon Fraser University, Canada. She is a professor in the chemistry department at the University of Costa Rica, and researcher at the Centro de Investigaciones en Productos Naturales, CIPRONA.  She was director of CIPRONA  from 2002 to 2010, and of the doctoral science program at the same university from 2009 to 2012.  Her scientific work focuses on the synthesis of organic anti-parasitic and anti-cancer chemicals.

References

1963 births
Living people
University of Costa Rica alumni
Academic staff of the University of Costa Rica
Simon Fraser University alumni
Place of birth missing (living people)